Morgan Michel Saint-Maximin (born 2 August 1997) is a Guadeloupean professional footballer who plays as a midfielder for the club Solidarité-Scolaire, and the Guadeloupe national team.

International career
Saint-Maximin debuted with the Guadeloupe national team in a 2–1 friendly win over Martinique on 23 June 2021. He was called up to represent Guadeloupe at the 2021 CONCACAF Gold Cup.

References

External links
 
 

1997 births
Living people
Guadeloupean footballers
Guadeloupe international footballers
Association football midfielders
2021 CONCACAF Gold Cup players